Sultan Abdullah Al-Mutassim Billah Shah Ibni Al-Marhum Sultan Ahmad Al-Muazzam Shah (عبد الله المعتصم بالله شاه, 12 October 1874 – 22 June 1932) was the third modern Sultan of Pahang who ruled from 1917 to 1932.

Early life

Born at the Royal Palace, Pekan Lama, 12 October 1874, he was the third son of Sultan Ahmad Muʽazzam and Cik Kusuma Sokma binti Tok Minal Daeng Koro. He has a stepbrother, Mahmud Shah II who was Raja Bendahara.

Reign
During his reign, Pahang was immersed in several political developments. The British government introduced legislation to modernize the Malay states and created the Federated Malay States in 1896 and the establishment of the Federal Council in 1909.  

Bitter resentment was generated against the effectiveness of the Rulers' participation in the Federal Council in the reign of Abdullah. The sultan was unhappy that Kuala Lumpur controlled a lot of power, even in affairs which he thought had nothing to do with the Federated Malay States, but only to do with Pahang. However, he acquiesced to those demands as he was dependent on the funds from the Federated Malay States, as Pahang stood to benefit from the wealth of Perak and Selangor.  

The sultan was mollified somewhat when during the governorship of Sir Laurence Guillemard there was intense activity to decentralise powers from the centre at Kuala Lumpur back to the individual states which comprised the Federated Malay States. However, he would not see this scheme materialize, neither did his successor as the Japanese invaded Malaya.  

Among other reforms initiated during Abdullah's reign was the abolishment of a modified form of the corvée system commonly practised in Pahang. Beginning 1919, substantial Malay reservation areas were opened to ensure that land remained available to local Malays. The Sultanate Lands Enactment was promulgated in 1919, vesting certain areas in the sultan and giving him the right to regulate the leasing and occupation of those areas.  

The year 1930 marked the creation of the title Tengku Mahkota ('crown prince') along with other new Malay titles, and the framing of agnatic rules of succession. In 1932, at the age of 20, Tengku Abu Bakar, son and heir of Abdullah was installed as the Tengku Mahkota of Pahang, the first time a prince ever had this title conferred upon.

Personal life
Abdullah married first to a woman known as Che' Endut. His second wife was Che Kalsum binti Tun Abdullah, daughter of a Terengganuan nobleman Tun Abdullah bin Tun Abdul Rauf, who later was made the Sultanah of Pahang ('high consort'). His first son from this marriage was Abu Bakar, who later succeeded him as the next sultan. Abdullah's third marriage was with Cik Wan Chantik binti Wan Muhammad Amin, daughter of a Pattani nobleman Wan Muhammad Amin. He had a total of ten sons and seven daughters from all his wives.

Death and succession 
By 1931, Abdullah's health began to fail, yet he still managed to attend the Durbar held in August that year. He died in 1932 at the Istana Kuning, Pekan on 22 June 1932 and was buried at the Royal Cemetery, Kuala Pahang. He was succeeded by his second son, Tengku Mahkota Abu Bakar.

References

Bibliography
 
 

Sultans of Pahang
1874 births
1932 deaths
Federated Malay States people
People from British Malaya
20th-century Malaysian politicians